An unobservable (also called impalpable) is an entity whose existence, nature, properties, qualities or relations are not directly observable by humans. In philosophy of science, typical examples of "unobservables" are the force of gravity, causation and beliefs or desires. The distinction between observable and unobservable plays a central role in Immanuel Kant's distinction between noumena and phenomena as well as in John Locke's distinction between primary and secondary qualities. The theory that unobservables posited by scientific theories exist is referred to as scientific realism. It contrasts with instrumentalism, which asserts that we should withhold ontological commitments to unobservables even though it is useful for scientific theories to refer to them. There is considerable disagreement about which objects should be classified as unobservable, for example, whether bacteria studied using microscopes or positrons studied using cloud chambers count as unobservable. Different notions of unobservability have been formulated corresponding to different types of obstacles to their observation.

Kant on noumena 
The distinction between "observable" and "unobservable" is similar to Immanuel Kant's distinction between noumena and phenomena. Noumena are the things-in-themselves, i.e., raw things in their necessarily unknowable state, before they pass through the formalizing apparatus of the senses and the mind in order to become perceived objects, which he refers to as "phenomena". According to Kant, humans can never know noumena; all that humans know is the phenomena.

Locke on primary and secondary qualities 
Kant's distinction is similar to John Locke's distinction between primary and secondary qualities.  Secondary qualities are what humans perceive such as redness, chirping, heat, mustiness or sweetness.  Primary qualities would be the actual qualities of the things themselves which give rise to the secondary qualities which humans perceive.

Philosophy of science 
The ontological nature and epistemological issues concerning unobservables are central topics in philosophy of science. The theory that unobservables posited by scientific theories exist is referred to as scientific realism. It contrasts with instrumentalism, which asserts that we should withhold ontological commitments to unobservables even though it is useful for scientific theories to refer to them.

The notion of observability plays a central role in constructive empiricism. According to van Fraassen, the goal of scientific theories is not truth about all entities but only truth about all observable entities. If a theory is true in this restricted sense, it is called an empirically adequate theory. Van Fraassen characterizes observability counterfactually: "X is observable if there are circumstances which are such that, if X is present to us under those circumstances, then we observe it".

A problem with this and similar characterizations is to determine the exact extension of what is unobservable. There is little controversy that regular everyday-objects that we can perceive without any aids are observable. Such objects include e.g. trees, chairs or dogs. But controversy starts with cases where unaided perception fails. This includes cases like using telescopes to study distant galaxies, using microscopes to study bacteria or using cloud chambers to study positrons.

Some philosophers have been motivated by these and similar examples to question the value of the distinction between observable and unobservable in general.

Kinds of unobservables 
W. V. Metcalf distinguishes three kinds of unobservables. One is the logically unobservable, which involves a contradiction. An example would be a length which is both longer and shorter than a given length. The second is the practically unobservable, that which we can conceive of as observable by the known sense-faculties of man but we are prevented from observing by practical difficulties. The third kind is the physically unobservable, that which can never be observed by any existing sense-faculties of man.

See also
 Empiricism
 Logical positivism
 Phenomenology
 Rationalism
 Hidden variable theory
 Object of the mind
 If a tree falls in a forest
 Unobservable chaos
 Proxy (statistics), for an unobservable variable

References 

Concepts in epistemology
Concepts in metaphysics